Yes, Yes Show! is a Philippine comedy-gag variety show on ABS-CBN. It was tagged as the first Live-Gag show in the Philippines. It aired from February 25, 2004, to 2006, replacing Whattamen.

Cast
 Bayani Agbayani
 Vhong Navarro
 Aiko Melendez
 Candy Pangilinan
 Tuesday Vargas
 Isko Salvador
 Lito Camo
 Vanna Garcia
 Thammie Aliwalas
 Viva Hot Babes
 Viva Hot Men
 Frances Garcia
 Pokwang
 Terry
 Janelle Jamer
 Clown In A Million Finalists
 Paw Diaz
 Joseph Garcia
 Sarah Geronimo (Guest Cast)

External links
 
Yes, Yes, Show! at Telebisyon.net

Philippine comedy television series
ABS-CBN original programming
2004 Philippine television series debuts
2006 Philippine television series endings
Filipino-language television shows